RPM (also known as R.P.M.) is a 1998 action film starring David Arquette, Emmanuelle Seigner, and Famke Janssen. It was shot in 1997 and first released on video in Germany on June 23, 1998.

Plot
Luke Delson (David Arquette) is a professional carjacker who is currently residing in Los Angeles. After a call, he decides to go to Nice, to track a car for an oil oligarch, Constantine Charkos. The car, named RPM, can apparently drive without any kind of power source. Charkos, afraid that the mass production of the car would destroy his oil empire, offers him 1 billion dollars to steal it. But with the police detective on his tail, Biggerman, the man who built RPM, and also his sister Claudia (Famke Janssen), who wants the money, on his tail, he will find it very difficult to steal the car. Along the way, he meets Charkos' girl (Emmanuelle Seigner), who wants her car back (which Luke has stolen, but Claudia took it), and she helps him steal the RPM in exchange for bringing her car back, and the two eventually start a romance.

Cast
 David Arquette as Luke Delson 
 Emmanuelle Seigner as Michelle Claire
 Famke Janssen as Claudia Haggs
 Steve John Shepherd as Rudy 
 Stephen Yardley as Chiarkos
 Kenneth Cranham as Biggerman
 John Bluthal as Grinkstein
 Jean-Luc Bideau as Inspector LeBlanc
 Debora Weston as Georgie
 George Rossi as Zantos
 Bob Sherman as Karl Delson
 Jonathan Cecil as Lord Baxter
 Patrick Allen as Millionaire
 Jerry Hall as Bored Girlfriend
 Stephane Eichenholc as Undercover Cop
 Jeff Harding as Tim Ryan
 Sheri Graubert as Karen
 James Larkin as Jonqull
 John Clive as Bentley Man
 Patrick Lebarz as Investor 1
 Paul Putney as Investor 2
 Lorenza Elana Marcais as Karl's Secretary
 Christian Bianchi as Attendant
 Frank Rainaut as Journalisit 1
 Alain Clement as Journalist 2
 Janine Michel as Grinkstein's Nurse
 Eugene Browne as Guard 1
 Marc Estrada as Guard 2
 Gregar Patersan as Guard 3
 Michael Wain as H.S. Owner
 Anne Batt as H.S. Owner's Wife
 Didier Belvisi as Motorcycle Cop 1
 Andre Luc Toussaint as Motorcycle Cop 2
 Monica Noto-Sigrist as Old Lady
 Guy Bozio-Bralind as Newsagent
 Steward Reading-Kitchen as U.S. Detective
 Spectre R42 as R.P.M.
 Tintin as Max the dog

Production

The film was mostly shot in the forests of France and in the Nice. The production ended in the summer of 1997. The film was recognized for many famous cars in the movie.

External links
 
 
 

1997 films
1997 action films
American action films
British action films
Films about automobiles
Films directed by Ian Sharp
1990s English-language films
1990s American films
1990s British films